The East Devonport Football Club is an Australian rules football club based on Devonport, Tasmania. The club competed in the North West Football League since 1987 until going into recess in 2021. The club currently has a full junior program in the NWFL.

History
The club competed on an irregular basis in various non-senior North Western competitions between 1901 and 1944 before being promoted to senior status to participate in the North West Football Union from 1945 to 1986. In 1987 the club joined the Northern Tasmanian Football League (renamed the North West Football League in 2015), and has competed continuously in that competition until 2020. The club's senior arm (under-16s and older) went into recess in 2021, but the club retains a presence at junior level.

Home Ground – Girdlestone Park 
Established – 1901 
Playing Colours – Red & White 
Emblem – Swans 
Club Theme Song – "Onwards To Victory" (Tune: "Notre Dame Victory March") 
Affiliations – Various junior competitions (1901–1944) NWFU (1945–1986), NTFL/NWFL (1987–present)

Premiership Titles
NWFU Premierships 
1946, 1948, 1968.

NTFL/NWFL Premierships
1988.

Tasmanian State Premierships
Nil.

Individual Medal winners
Wander Medal winners 
 1952  – Max Berryman
 1957  – Darrel Baldock
 1960  – Terry Pierce
 1963  – John Bingley
 1975  – Ricky Watt
 1980  – Lindsay Bell
 1982  – Richard Lynch
 1985  – Neville Muir
 1986  – Peter Borlini

Ovaltine Medal winners 
 1995  – Paul Spencer

Pivot Medal winners 
 1998  – Craig Muir

Darrel Baldock Medal winners 
 2002  – Adrian Partridge

Competition Leading Goalkickers
NWFU Leading Goalkickers 
 1954  – Ray Summers (38)
 1980  – Chris Reynolds (95)
 1981  – Chris Reynolds (97)

NTFL/NWFL Leading Goalkickers
 1988  – Mark Williams (119)

Club Records
Club Record Score 
 36.13 (229) v George Town 11.4 (70) in 1987

'''Club Record Games Holder 
  – Shane McCoy (263)

Club Record Match Attendance
 11,866 – East Devonport v Ulverstone at West Park Oval for the 1968 NWFU Grand Final.

Notable players
Graham Wright was drafted in the 1987 VFL draft to Collingwood Football Club and achieved premiership success in 1990.
Darrel Baldock began his senior football career with the Swans before moving to Latrobe Football Club and then to St Kilda Football Club where he captained the team to their first premiership in 1966.
Graeme Lee finished his football career at the East Devonport Football Club He played 127 games while captain coach of the club from 1968-1975

References

External links
Official Facebook
East Devonport on Full Points Footy

Australian rules football clubs in Tasmania
1901 establishments in Australia
Australian rules football clubs established in 1901
Sport in Devonport, Tasmania
North West Football League clubs